Nanobalcis is a genus of minute sea snails, marine gastropod mollusks in the family Eulimidae.

Species
 Nanobalcis cherbonnieri Warén, 1990
 Nanobalcis nana (Monterosato, 1878)
 Nanobalcis worsfoldi Warén, 1990
Species brought into synonymy
 Nanobalcis chondrocidaricola (Warén, B. L. Burch & T. A. Burch, 1984): synonym of Vitreolina chondrocidaricola Warén, B. L. Burch & T. A. Burch, 1984
 Nanobalcis hawaiiensis (Warén, B. L. Burch & T. A. Burch, 1984): synonym of Vitreolina hawaiiensis Warén, B. L. Burch & T. A. Burch, 1984

References

External links
 To World Register of Marine Species
  Warén A. & Mifsud C. (1990). Nanobalcis a new eulimid genus (Prosobranchia) parasitic on cidaroid sea urchins, with two new species, and comments on Sabinella bonifaciae (Nordsieck). Bollettino Malacologico 26 (1-4): 37-46

Eulimidae